The Best of Obituary is a compilation album by death metal band Obituary, released in 2008.

Track listing

Personnel
 John Tardy – vocals
 Trevor Peres – rhythm guitar
 James Murphy – lead guitar (tracks 4–6)
 Allen West – lead guitar (tracks 1-3, 7–13)
 Daniel Tucker – bass (tracks 1–3)
 Frank Watkins – bass (tracks 4–13)
 Donald Tardy – drums

References

Obituary (band) albums
2008 compilation albums
Roadrunner Records compilation albums